Amblyseius fraterculus is a species of mite in the family Phytoseiidae.

References

fraterculus
Articles created by Qbugbot
Animals described in 1916